Vaulx-Vraucourt is a commune in the Pas-de-Calais department in the Hauts-de-France region of France.

Geography

History
The commune name comes from the two hamlets that were combined into one commune in 1821. 
The village was the site of heavy fighting during World War I.  Major battles occurred in this area in 1917 and 1918.  Four military cemeteries are located in and around the village, containing the graves of soldiers from the United Kingdom, Canada, Australia, and New Zealand.

Population

Places of interest
 The church of St.Martin, rebuilt, as was all of the village, after World War I
 The underground remains of an old chateau.
 A seventeenth century dovecote.
 The Commonwealth War Graves Commission cemeteries.

See also
Communes of the Pas-de-Calais department

References

External links

 Vaulx Hill CWGC cemetery
 Vaulx Hill CWGC cemetery
 Vaulx Australian CWGC cemetery
 Vraucourt Copse CWGC cemetery
 A website about Vaulx-Vraucourt 

Communes of Pas-de-Calais
Military monuments and memorials
Western Front (World War I)